The rufous-capped lark (Calandrella eremica) is a small passerine bird of the lark family found in southwestern Arabia and Somaliland. 

It was considered to be a subspecies of Blanford's lark.

References

Rufous-capped lark
Rufous-capped lark